The National Narcotics Board (abbreviated BNN) is a government agency of Indonesia. BNN is responsible for minimizing the abuse of controlled substances through prevention and law enforcement measures directed primarily at illegal drug abuse and drug trafficking.

Organizational structure
BNN is led by the Head of BNN. The Head of BNN is always an active police officer, however civil servants are allowed to be the Head of BNN. The Head of BNN reports directly to the president and coordinates with the chief of national police.

BNN organization is consist of:
Head of BNN
Main Secretariat
Deputy of Prevention
Deputy of Community Empowerment
Deputy of Eradication
Deputy of Rehabilitation
Deputy of Legal Affairs and Cooperation
Main Inspectorate
Research, Data and Information Center
Human Resource Development Center
Narcotics Laboratory
Narcotics Board Regional Office (Province level)
Narcotics Board Regional Office (City/Regency level)

Weapons 
BNN officers are trained in the use of firearms.

 CZ P-07 – standard issue sidearm
 Saiga-12S EXP-01 – standard issue shotgun

References

External links

 National Narcotics Board 

Law enforcement agencies of Indonesia